Ernst Hofer may refer to:

 Ernst Hofer (cyclist) (1902–?), Swiss cyclist
 Ernst Hofer (judoka) (born 1971), Austrian judoka